Cavaignac is a surname. Notable people with the surname include:

 Jean-Baptiste Cavaignac (1762–1829), French politician
 His eldest son, Eleonore Louis Godefroi Cavaignac (1801–1845), journalist
 His second son, Louis Eugène Cavaignac (1802–1857), general and politician
 Louis Eugène's son, Jacques Marie Eugène Godefroy Cavaignac (1853–1905), politician
 Jean Baptiste's (1762–1829) brother,  (1765–1845), politician
 Jean Baptiste's (1762–1829) brother, Jacques-Marie, vicomte Cavaignac (1773–1855), general